Leslie Gromis-Baker is a Republican fundraiser and political aide in Pennsylvania. She is considered "one of the state’s most sought after properties."

She was Pennsylvania state political director for George W. Bush. She first rose to prominence as political director for Pennsylvania Governor Tom Ridge.  In 2010, Politics Magazine named her one of the most influential Republicans in Pennsylvania.

She served as a top aide for Bill Scranton's 2006 campaign for Pennsylvania Governor.

In 2004, she became a partner and senior advisor for BrabenderCox.

She and John Brabender developed a politically themed television program, "Moving Numbers."

References

Living people
Pennsylvania Republicans
Pennsylvania political consultants
Year of birth missing (living people)